Weak in the Presence of Beauty is the second and final studio album by English band Floy Joy, which was produced by Don Was and released by Virgin in 1986.

The album's title track was released as the lead single and reached No. 85 in the UK Singles Chart. "Friday Night in This Cold City" was also released as a single but did not chart.

Background
In 1985, Floy Joy underwent member changes with the departure of founding member Shaun Ward and singer Carroll Thompson. The band's percussionist and backing vocalist, Desy Campbell, became the lead vocalist and multi-instrumentalist Rob Clarke joined the group.

Speaking of the album, Michael Ward told Music Week in 1986, "The album is as abstract as the first one, but you've got to look a little below the surface, read the lyrics and listen to the album, then you'll get a complete picture."

Critical reception

On its release, Jim Reid of Record Mirror wrote, Weak in the Presence of Beauty is at times a beautifully wrapped record [with] careful crafted professionalism. But, in the main, this work is like so much antiseptic in the hands of a vocalist who is straining and clawing for the right touch. Desy Campbell is not a bad singer, it's just that those tasty Floy touches deserve something more than what amounts to an ersatz soul vocal." He added that the album "stands too much on one level" in comparison with the band's debut Into the Hot, which he considered "invigorating" with a "constantly interesting mix of images and moods".

Paul Massey of the Aberdeen Evening Express wrote, "The soul-tinged tracks beat the funk-based tunes hands down, but a real joy." He added the album was worth buying for the "brilliant" "Penny In My Pocket" which he described as "a sad late-night lament sung with extraordinary feeling". Mike Abrams of The Ottawa Citizen commented, "New vocalist Desy Campbell's vocals are more aggressive and muscular than his predecessor. [His] vocals have added a harder edge to the band's pop songs. The enthralling single, "Weak in the Presence of Beauty", the sax-driven "Friday Night" and the soulful "Penny in My Pocket" are three solid pop performances."

Track listing
All tracks written by Michael Ward and Robert E. Clarke; except where noted.
 "Weak in the Presence of Beauty" (3:28)
 "Friday Night" (6:36)
 "Penny in My Pocket" (4:22)
 "Too Drunk to Funk" (3:49)
 "Ask the Lonely" (William "Mickey" Stevenson, Ivy Jo Hunter) (3:43)
 "Chinese A-Go Go" (4:01)
 "Crackdown" (2:49)
 "Walking in The Night" (3:26)
 "This is My Time" (Desy Campbell) (1:59)
 "It Makes No Difference to Me" (3:26)

Singles
 "Weak in the Presence of Beauty" – UK #85, AUS #29
 "Friday Night in This Cold City"

Personnel
Floy Joy
 Desy Campbell – lead vocals, backing vocals
 Michael Ward – saxophone, flute, backing vocals
 Robert E. Clarke – bass, drum machine

Additional musicians
 Luis Resto – piano, synthesizer, Emulator 2, melodica
 Don Was – synthesizer, mandolin
 G. E. Smith, Randy Jacobs, Bruce Nazarian, John "Dred" Edmed – guitar
 John Edmund – additional guitar (tracks 2, 3)
 David McMurray – tenor saxophone
 Joe Teir – mouth trumpet
 Harry Bowens – backing vocals, backing vocal arrangements
 Sweet Pea Atkinson, Donald Ray Mitchell, Buster Marbury, Carol Hall – backing vocals
 Steve Ferrone – drums
 Kevin Tschirhart – congas
 Paul Riser – orchestrations

Production
 Don "Don" Was – producer
 Garzelle McDonald – production assistance
 Frank Filipetti – mixing (tracks 1, 4, 7-10), additional engineering
 John "Dred" Edmed – remixing (tracks 2-3, 5-6)
 Steve "Doc Ching" King – engineer
 Chris Irwin – additional engineering
 Noah Baron, Billy Miranda, Mike Bigwood – assistant engineers

Other
 Mick Haggerty – artwork
 Clare Muller – photography

Charts

References

1986 albums
Albums produced by Don Was
Virgin Records albums
Floy Joy (band) albums